Gregory James Norton (born March 13, 1959) is an American musician, formerly of the band Hüsker Dü.

Early life
Norton was born in Davenport, Iowa, as this was the most local Catholic hospital to his family’s home in Rock Island, Illinois. He attended Henry Sibley High School in Mendota Heights, Minnesota.

Career

Norton first began playing with the band that would become Hüsker Dü with Grant Hart, Bob Mould, and keyboardist Charlie Pine in 1979 as "Buddy and the Returnables," after meeting them through his job at St. Paul record store Cheapo Records. 

Norton played bass on all of Hüsker Dü's recordings from its formation to its breakup album Warehouse: Songs and Stories. While the majority of the band's songwriting was done by bandmates Bob Mould and Grant Hart, Norton contributed the songs  "M.T.C.," "Don't Have a Life" and "Let's Go Die" to Hüsker Dü's debut EP Land Speed Record. 

After Hüsker Dü disbanded in 1988, Norton formed the band Grey Area with Hüsker Dü engineer and former member of Fine Art Colin Mansfield as well as Jo Jones. After Grey Area disbanded in 1991, Norton left the music business to focus on the restaurant business, opening The Norton's Restaurant (now closed) in Red Wing, Minnesota. Norton returned to the recording industry in 2006, with a new avant jazz band, Gang Font feat. Interloper. The group is composed of Norton, Dave King (of The Bad Plus, Happy Apple, Halloween, Alaska, 12 Rods and the Love-Cars), Erik Fratzke of Zebulon Pike and Happy Apple, and Craig Taborn.

In 2016, Norton joined La Crosse, Wisconsin band Porcupine as their bass player to replace Davey Reinders.

In 2022, Norton joined the band Ultrabomb  as their bass player. However, before the band could begin its tour in the UK, Norton was diagnosed with prostate cancer.  The band cancelled its planned appearances in England and Scotland so Norton could undergo treatment at the Mayo Clinic in the U.S.  

Norton has been honored with a star on the outside mural of the Minneapolis nightclub First Avenue for his work with Hüsker Dü. The stars recognize performers that have played sold-out shows or have otherwise demonstrated a major contribution to the culture at the iconic venue. Receiving a star "might be the most prestigious public honor an artist can receive in Minneapolis," according to journalist Steve Marsh.

References

External links 
Greg Norton's MySpace

1959 births
Living people
American punk rock bass guitarists
Alternative rock bass guitarists
People from Rock Island, Illinois
Hüsker Dü members
Hardcore punk musicians
American restaurateurs
Guitarists from Minnesota
Guitarists from Illinois
American male bass guitarists
20th-century American bass guitarists
20th-century American male musicians